Oceania Rugby, previously known as the Federation of Oceania Rugby Unions (FORU), is the regional governing body for rugby union in Oceania. It was founded in 2000 to represent the interests of Oceania rugby within World Rugby, the international governing body. It presently encompasses fourteen full members and two associate members.

Tournaments
Under the umbrella of World Rugby, Oceania Rugby oversees the following competitions:

 Pacific Nations Cup
 Pacific Challenge
 Oceania Rugby Men's Championship
 Oceania Rugby Men's Sevens Championship
 Oceania Rugby Women's Championship
 Oceania Rugby Women's Sevens Championship
 Oceania Rugby Under 20 Championship

Members
There are 14 full members of Oceania Rugby:

There is 2 associate members of Oceania Rugby:

World Rugby Rankings

Notes
 The French Rugby Federation is the governing body affiliated with World Rugby, with a regional section for New Caledonia.

 The Tuvalu Rugby Union is not yet affiliated with World Rugby.

 The French Rugby Federation is the governing body affiliated with World Rugby, with a regional section for Wallis and Futuna.

The Nauru Rugby Union applied for World Rugby affiliation in 2015.

References

External links
 Oceania Rugby official site

 
Sports organizations established in 2000
2000 establishments in Oceania